A major (or the key of A) is a major scale based on A, with the pitches A, B, C, D, E, F, and G. Its key signature has three sharps. Its relative minor is F-sharp minor and its parallel minor is A minor. The key of A major is the only key where the Neapolitan sixth chord on  (i.e.  the flattened supertonic) requires both a flat and a natural accidental.

The A major scale is:

In the treble, alto, and bass clefs, the G in the key signature is placed higher than C. However, in the tenor clef, it would require a ledger line and so G is placed lower than C.

History 
Although not as rare in the symphonic literature as sharper keys (those containing more than three sharps), symphonies in A major are less common than in keys with fewer sharps such as D major or G major. Beethoven's Symphony No. 7, Bruckner's Symphony No. 6 and Mendelssohn's Symphony No. 4 comprise a nearly complete list of symphonies in this key in the Romantic era. Mozart's Clarinet Concerto and Clarinet Quintet are both in A major, along with his 23rd Piano Concerto, and generally Mozart was more likely to use clarinets in A major than in any other key besides E-flat major. Moreover, the climax part of Tchaikovsky's Violin Concerto is also in A major.

The key of A occurs frequently in chamber music and other music for strings, which favor sharp keys. Franz Schubert's Trout Quintet and Antonín Dvořák's Piano Quintet No. 2 are both in A major. Johannes Brahms, César Franck, and Gabriel Fauré wrote violin sonatas in A major. In connection to Beethoven's Kreutzer Sonata, Peter Cropper said that A major "is the fullest sounding key for the violin."

According to Christian Friedrich Daniel Schubart, A major is a key suitable for "declarations of innocent love, ... hope of seeing one's beloved again when parting; youthful cheerfulness and trust in God."

For orchestral works in A major, the timpani are typically set to A and E a fifth apart, rather than a fourth apart as for most other keys. Hector Berlioz complained about the custom of his day in which timpani tuned to A and E a fifth apart were notated C and G a fourth apart, a custom which survived as late as the music of Franz Berwald.

Notable compositions in A major 

 Wolfgang Amadeus Mozart
 Violin Concerto No. 5, K. 219
 Symphony No. 29, K. 201
 Violin Sonata No. 22, K. 305
 Piano Sonata No. 11, K. 331
 String Quartet No. 18, K. 464
 Piano Concerto No. 23, K. 488
 Clarinet Quintet, K. 581
 Clarinet Concerto, K. 622
 Ludwig van Beethoven
 Symphony No. 7, Op. 92
 Piano Sonata No. 2, Op. 2/2
 Piano Sonata No. 28, Op. 101
 Violin Sonata No. 6, Op. 30/1
 Violin Sonata No. 9, Op. 47
 Cello Sonata No. 3, Op. 69
 String Quartet No. 5, Op. 18/5
 Franz Schubert
 Trout Quintet
 Piano Sonata, D 664
Piano Sonata No. 20, D. 959
 Felix Mendelssohn
 Symphony No. 4, Op. 90 ("Italian")
 Frédéric Chopin
 Polonaise, Op. 40/1 ("Military")
 Prelude, Op. 28/7
 Franz Liszt
 Piano Concerto No. 2, S.125
 Johannes Brahms
 Serenade No. 2, Op. 16
 Violin Sonata No. 2, Op. 100 ("Thun")
 Piano Quartet No. 2, Op. 26
 César Franck
 Violin Sonata
 Anton Bruckner
 Symphony No. 6
 Émile Waldteufel
 Les Patineurs waltz, Op. 183
 Sergei Prokofiev
 Piano Sonata No. 6, Op. 82
 Dmitri Shostakovich
 String Quartet No. 2, Op. 68
 Symphony No. 15, Op. 141

See also
Major and minor
Chord (music)
Chord names and symbols (popular music)

References

External links

Musical keys
Major scales